George Albert Turnham (February 9, 1859 – December 3, 1948) was an businessman, road and bridge contractor, and politician.

Turnham was born near Long Lake, Hennepin County, Minnesota. He lived in Long Lake, Minnesota with his wife and family and was a road and bridge contractor. Turnham served on the Orono, Minnesota Township Board and was the chair. Turnham served in the Minnesota Senate from 1915 to 1930.

References

1859 births
1948 deaths
People from Long Lake, Minnesota
Businesspeople from Minnesota
Minnesota city council members
Minnesota state senators